"Vois comme c'est beau" (meaning "Look How Beautiful it Is") is a duet between Claudette Dion and her sister, Celine Dion, released as a single from Claudette Dion's album Hymnes à l'amour: Volume 2. It was issued on 10 June 1985 in Quebec, Canada. "Vois comme c'est beau" has never appeared on any of Celine Dion's albums. On 22 June 1985, the song entered the chart in Quebec, spending eight weeks on it and peaking at number fourteen.

Track listings and formats
Canadian 7" single
"Vois comme c'est beau" – 3:26
"Un enfant c'est comme ça" – 3:57

Charts

References

1985 singles
1985 songs
Celine Dion songs
French-language songs
Female vocal duets